Gibbings is a surname.

People with the name include:

People
 Charles William Gibbings (1916-2009) Canadian agricultural activist
 Robert Gibbings (1889-1958) Irish artist
 T. H. Robsjohn-Gibbings (1905-1976) British architect

Fictional characters
 Clara Gibbings, main character from the eponymous 1934 Australian film Clara Gibbings

See also

 Chris Gibbin, U.S. filmmaker
Gibbins (surname)